Sergio Zanatta (born 8 August 1946) is a Canadian former soccer player who earned three caps for the Canadian national side in 1968. He played club football for Vancouver Columbus and Vancouver Whitecaps.

References

External links
 
 NASL career stats

1946 births
Living people
Canada men's international soccer players
Canadian soccer players
Association football forwards
Italian emigrants to Canada
Naturalized citizens of Canada
Vancouver Columbus players
Vancouver Whitecaps (1974–1984) players
North American Soccer League (1968–1984) players
North American Soccer League (1968–1984) indoor players